Arhopala aexone   is a species of butterfly in the family Lycaenidae. It was first described by William Chapman Hewitson in 1863. It is found in the Australasian realm.

Subspecies
 A. a. aexone New Guinea, Aru, Buru, Waigeu, Biak, Noemfoor, Manam, Fergusson, Trobriand, Saint Aignan, New Ireland
 A. a. chrysoana  Fruhstorfer, 1914  Halmahera

References

External links
Arhopala Boisduval, 1832 at Markku Savela's Lepidoptera and Some Other Life Forms. Retrieved June 3, 2017.

Arhopala
Butterflies described in 1863